Hingani Dam, also called Pangaon Dam is an earthfill dam on Bhogawati river near Barshi, Solapur district in state of Maharashtra in India.

Specifications

Purpose
 Irrigation

See also
 Dams in Maharashtra
 List of reservoirs and dams in India

References

Dams in Solapur district
Dams completed in 1977
1977 establishments in Maharashtra